Eagleson Road (Ottawa Road #49) is a northwest-southeast road in Ottawa's west end in Kanata. It starts at Highway 417 and ends at Brophy Drive south of Richmond. North of Highway 417 it becomes March Road. It is a key link, primarily for residents of Bridlewood, between both ends of Kanata where housing developments are growing steadily in the north and the south. The primary segment of Eagleson Road is divided and six lanes wide (three per direction) between Highway 417 and Abbeyhill Drive, while between Abbeyhill Drive and just south of Stonehaven Drive it is a four-lane divided arterial. South of that, Eagleson is a two-lane undivided rural road. 

The alignment of Teron Road south of Campeau Drive was formerly Eagleson (Side) Road, prior to Highway 417 being extended to the west.

Key locations on this road include Eagleson Station from the OC Transpo's transitway system. Just south of the intersection with Hazeldean Road is the Hazeldean Mall, an important mall for the community.

Major intersections

March Road continues north of Highway 417.

 Highway 417 
 Katimavik Road & Timm Drive
 Kakulu Road
 Hazeldean Road & Robertson Road
 Hazeldean Mall (300 Eagleson Road)
 Abbeyhill Drive
 Palomino Drive
 Rothesay Drive & Palomino Drive
 Stonehaven Drive & Michael Cowpland Drive
 Real Canadian Superstore (760 Eagleson Road)
 Cope Drive & Cadence Gate
 Fernbank Road
 Bridgestone Drive
 Emerald Meadows Drive & Romina Street
 Terry Fox Drive & Hope Side Road
 Fallowfield Road
 Old Richmond Road & Perth Street
 Barnsdale Road
 Via Rail crossing
 Ottawa Street
 Brophy Drive

Eagleson Road continues south as McCordick Road.

Communities

 Kanata Town Centre
 Katimavik-Hazeldean
 Glen Cairn
 Bridlewood 
 Richmond

External links

 Eagleson Road Project
 Google Maps: Eagleson Road

Roads in Ottawa